France Amateurs may refer to:

 France national amateur football team
 France national amateur rugby union team